Destructive fishing practices are practices that easily result in irreversible damage to aquatic habitats and ecosystems. Many fishing techniques can be destructive if used inappropriately, but some practices are particularly likely to result in irreversible damage. These practices are mostly, though not always, illegal (see also illegal, unreported and unregulated fishing). Where they are illegal, they are often inadequately enforced.

Overview 

The narrowest definition of destructive fishing practices refers principally to bottom trawling over vulnerable habitat (shallow corals, deep sea corals, or seagrass, for example), as well as practices such as shark finning, blast fishing, poison fishing, muro-ami, and push netting. These latter practices are not significant within the fishing zones of most developed nations, being generally outlawed.

A wider and more useful definition would include:
 overfishing beyond reasonable recovery limits, including serial overfishing;
 excessive or damaging levels of bycatch ;
 the fishing of spawning aggregations without precautionary justification ;
 intensive fishing over vulnerable habitats, including for example spawning and nursery areas; and
 highgrading–the practice of discarding the lower quality portion of the target catch.

This definition could be extended to cover activities such as:
 ghost fishing by lost or discarded gear, 
 shark netting of popular swimming beaches (with high incidental catch), 
 amateur use of fish aggregating devices or traps where they increase the likelihood of locally unsustainable catch levels,
 spearfishing at night or with SCUBA, as well as 'industrial' spearfishing,
 use of stainless steel hooks or traps;
 commercial and recreational use of gill nets and traps with high incidental kill, and
 deliberate (and sometimes illegal) destruction of marine life perceived as “getting in the way” of fishing operations.

History 
The term "destructive fishing practices" (or DFPs) has been featured in international fisheries literature since about the 1980s. No widely accepted definition of the phrase exists, and this will almost certainly remain the situation, given very different national and industry perspectives. 

The Outcomes and Implementation Statements of the World Summit on Sustainable Development, held in Johannesburg in 2002, contain a commitment to phasing out destructive fishing practices in the marine environment by the year 2012. All nations attending the summit supported this statement.

Many nations had made commitments to end destructive fishing practices much earlier. In 1999, 124 nations explicitly gave their support to the FAO Code of Conduct for Responsible Fisheries 1995 through the Rome Declaration on Responsible Fisheries. The list of these nations includes most of the major fishing nations of the world. However, while the Code of Conduct contains a commitment to end destructive fishing practices, the Code contains no timelines.

Methods

Blast fishing 

Dynamite or blast fishing is done easily and cheaply with dynamite or homemade bombs made from locally available materials. Fish are killed by the shock from the blast and are then skimmed from the surface or collected from the bottom. The explosions indiscriminately kill large numbers of fish and other marine organisms in the vicinity and can damage or destroy the physical environment. Explosions are particularly harmful to coral reefs. Blast fishing is also illegal in many waterways around the world.

Bottom trawling 

Bottom trawling is trawling (towing a trawl, which is a fishing net) along the sea floor. It is also referred to as "dragging". The scientific community divides bottom trawling into benthic trawling and demersal trawling. Benthic trawling is towing a net at the very bottom of the ocean and demersal trawling is towing a net just above the benthic zone. Bottom trawling targets both bottom-living fish (groundfish) and semi-pelagic species such as cod, squid, shrimp, and rockfish.

Bottom fishing has operated for over a century on heavily fished grounds such as the North Sea and Grand Banks. While overfishing has long been recognised as causing major ecological changes to the fish community on the Grand Banks, concern has been raised more recently about the damage which benthic trawling inflicts upon seabed communities. A species of particular concern is the slow growing, deep water coral Lophelia pertusa. This species is home to a diverse community of deep sea organisms, but is easily damaged by fishing gear. On 17 November 2004, the United Nations General Assembly urged nations to consider temporary bans on high seas bottom trawling.

Bottom trawling over vulnerable habitat, however, will continue within the Exclusive Fishing Zones of most nations until governments have mapped the location of vulnerable habitats, and taken steps to exclude all bottom trawling activities from these areas.

Cyanide fishing 

Cyanide fishing is a method of collecting live fish mainly for use in aquariums, which involves spraying a sodium cyanide mixture into the desired fish's habitat in order to stun the fish. The practice hurts not only the target population, but also many other marine organisms, including coral and thus coral reefs.

Recent studies have shown that the combination of cyanide use and stress of post capture handling results in mortality of up to 75% of the organisms within less than 48 hours of capture. With such high mortality numbers, a greater number of fish must be caught in order to offset post catch death.

Muro-ami 

Muro-ami is a destructive artisan fishing method employed on coral reefs in Southeast Asia. An encircling net is used with pounding devices, such as large stones fitted on ropes that are pounded onto the coral reefs. They can also consist of large heavy blocks of cement suspended above the sea by a crane fitted to the vessel. The pounding devices are repeatedly lowered into the area encircled by the net, smashing the coral into small fragments in order to scare the fish out of their coral refuges. The "crushing" effect on the coral heads has been described as having long-lasting and practically totally destructive effects.

See also
 Environmental impact of fishing
 Sustainable fishery

References

External links
 Nevill, Jon (2007) Destructive fishing practices: definitions
 Destructive fishing practices: definitions  - Conservation Science Institute
 Fishing problems: Destructive fishing practices - WWF
 Destructive fishing practices - European Commission
 Questions and Answers on Destructive Fishing Practices - European Commission

Environmental impact of fishing
Illegal, unreported and unregulated fishing